Alfie Bavidge (born 11 April 2006) is a Scottish footballer who plays for Scottish Premiership side Aberdeen.

Career

Bavidge started his career with Aberdeen.
After impressing in the academy scoring plenty of goals along the way, he made his League debut on 4 February 2023 for Aberdeen coming on as a second-half substitute in a 3–1 win against Motherwell.

References

2006 births
Living people
Scottish footballers
Aberdeen F.C. players
Scottish Professional Football League players
Association football forwards
Footballers from Aberdeen